Colour of right is the legal concept in the UK and other Commonwealth countries of an accused's permission to the usage or conversion of an asset in the possession of another. In New Zealand's Crimes Act, colour of right "means an honest belief that an act is justifiable...". Using this as a defence does not automatically guarantee an acquittal; however, it does diminish the mens rea component needed for a conviction. 

Example:

Bram's friend lets him use his van to go to a party later that night. Neither Bram nor the van return the next day. Bram comes back five days later after using the van to go on a camping trip. Bram goes to court for theft. He argues that he thought that he had the right to use the van for the camping trip because he was allowed to use the van to go the party.

The concept can also refer to a right, authority or power conferred on an official by way of a relationship between various statutory or regulatory instruments, where the official is granted a position's powers without having to actually occupy the position.

 Example:
In New Zealand the law grants a Fire Police officer, when on duty, all the power and authority and responsibility of, a constable.
The traffic regulations deny the use of flashing blue lights to any except police officers, and allow vehicles involved in fire service operations to deploy red flashing lights. However, by colour of right, a member of a Fire Police unit would have a legal defence if charged with unlawful use of a blue light through of s33 of the Fire Service Act 1975. As a practical matter New Zealand Fire Service policy says that Fire Police are not to use blue beacons, but such a policy carries no significance in relation to criminal law.

References

 [{Law in Action. Understanding Canadian Law}]

Common law legal terminology